Clint Black is an American country music singer. His discography consists of 14 studio albums, eight compilation albums, one extended play and 50 singles. Black debuted in 1989 with the single "A Better Man", the first of four consecutive Number One country hits from his album Killin' Time for RCA Nashville. Over the next decade, he released six more albums for RCA and two more on his own label, Equity Music Group. Black's RCA albums are all certified gold or higher by the Recording Industry Association of America (RIAA). He has sold 19 million albums worldwide.

Among his singles, Black has sent 13 cuts to Number One on the Hot Country Songs charts and 15 other singles within Top 10 on the same. His longest-lasting Number Ones are "Nobody's Home" and "Like the Rain" at three weeks each.

Studio albums

1980s–1990s

2000s–2020s

Live albums

Compilation albums

Extended plays

Singles

1980s–1990s

2000s–2020s

Christmas singles

As a featured artist

Other charted songs

B-sides

Music videos

Guest appearances

Notes

References

Black, Clint
 
 
Discographies of American artists